Neither is the only opera by Morton Feldman, dating from 1977. Its libretto is a 16-line poem by Samuel Beckett. Composer and librettist had met in Berlin two years earlier with plans for a collaboration for Rome Opera. However, Beckett told Feldman that he himself did not like opera. Feldman had echoed Beckett’s sentiment, so that the work emerged in Rome as a setting for soprano soloist only, accompanied by orchestra. It could theoretically be termed a “monodrama”; however, given the creators’ disdain for opera, the label “anti-opera” fits better.

Recordings
 HatHut, hat (now) ART 180: Sarah Leonard, soprano; Radio-Sinfonie-Orchester Frankfurt; Zoltán Peskó, conductor
 Col Legno, WWE 1CD 20081: Petra Hoffman, soprano; Symphonieorchester des Bayerischen Rundfunks; Kwamé Ryan, conductor

See also
neither (short story)

References

External links
 The Modern World, pages on: Feldman and Beckett Neither
 JazzLoft page on recording of Neither 
 Neither Wealth Nor Splendor: Getting Morton Feldman’s and Samuel Beckett’s 1977 opera NEITHER from a Workshop Performance in NYC to the Konzerthaus in Vienna and the Obstacles Concerned.

English-language operas
Operas
Operas by Morton Feldman
Works by Samuel Beckett
1977 operas